The Best of New Order (stylised as (the best of) NewOrder) is a greatest hits album by English band New Order. It was released in the United Kingdom on 21 November 1994 by London Records and, with a different track listing, in the United States on 14 March 1995 by Qwest Records and Warner Bros. Records. Like Republic, the band's most recent studio album at the time, the cover and liner notes stylise the group's name as one word (NewOrder) instead of the usual New Order.

Background
The Best of New Order is the second compilation album released by the group and follows their first, the hugely successful Substance album by seven years. The group had taken a hiatus due to tensions and disputes during the recording and touring of their 1993 album, Republic. Republic had been the first album that the group had released on London Records, and with the group announcing little intention of working together in the near future, the label went ahead compiling The Best of New Order.

The compilation primarily consists of seven-inch mixes of the group's singles from 1985 onwards. New versions of "True Faith", "Bizarre Love Triangle", "1963" and "Round & Round" appear in alternative mixes. The collection also includes one non-single track, "Vanishing Point" (from the LP Technique), though the song was already popularised as the theme tune to the BBC series Making Out. Only "Thieves Like Us" (the oldest track included, from 1984) appears in the same form as on the earlier compilation, Substance. The liner notes (first on a New Order album) were provided by journalist Paul Morley.

The US version of the album omits three tracks ("The Perfect Kiss", "Shellshock" and "Thieves Like Us"). This was purportedly due to the band's American label, Qwest, not wishing for some of the singles already included on Substance to be duplicated on this compilation. Instead, one album track from each of New Order's first three albums is included ("Dreams Never End" from Movement, "Age of Consent" from Power, Corruption & Lies, and "Love Vigilantes" from Low-Life), as well as a previously unreleased vocal version of the track "Let's Go (Nothing for Me)" from the 1987 film soundtrack Salvation!.

The following year, a companion remix album titled The Rest of New Order was released, with similar cover art.

Release and reception

The Best of New Order was released on CD, cassette, double LP, VHS and Laserdisc. Limited editions bundled together the cassette and CD in a box set. Video and Laserdisc versions included singles that do not appear on other versions, namely "Confusion", "State of the Nation" and "Spooky".

Critical reception was generally positive. Although AllMusic's William Ruhlmann felt it was not as good a compilation as Substance (1987), he viewed the album as an exceptional overview of New Order's 1980s and early 1990s music. In his review for The Village Voice of the US edition, Robert Christgau said that the album shows why he prefers Bernard Sumner's impassive quality over the despairing Ian Curtis:

The album sold well in the Christmas market and peaked at number four on the UK Albums Chart, and was certified Platinum by the British Phonographic Industry (BPI). Internationally, the compilation reached number 23 in Canada, number 27 in New Zealand, number 30 in Australia, and number 78 on the US Billboard 200. As of May 2006, it had sold 428,000 copies in the United States.

"True Faith-94" and "1963" were released as singles to promote the compilation. "True Faith-94" was released in November 1994, and reached number nine in the UK and number 11 in Ireland. "1963" (dubbed "1963–95") was remixed by Arthur Baker in a guitar-driven arrangement and released the following January; it reached number 21 in the UK and number 29 in Ireland.

Track listing

Video release
 "True Faith-94"
 "Regret"
 "Run"
 "Bizarre Love Triangle"
 "Fine Time"
 "The Perfect Kiss"
 "Shellshock"
 "Confusion"
 "Blue Monday-88"
 "Round & Round-94"
 "World"
 "Ruined in a Day"
 "State of the Nation"
 "Touched by the Hand of God"
 "World in Motion"
 "Spooky"
 "True Faith"
 "Round & Round" ("Patti" version)

Personnel 
 New Order – Production (All tracks except "Dreams Never End")
 Stephen Hague – Production ("True Faith-94", "1963", "Regret", "Ruined in a Day", "World (Price of Love)", and "World in Motion")
 Martin Hannett – Production ("Dreams Never End")
 Arthur Baker – Production ("Let's Go (Nothing for Me)")
 Mike "Spike" Drake – Production ("True Faith-94", "Bizarre Love Triangle-94", "1963–94" and "Round & Round-94")
 John Robie – Production ("Shellshock")
 Peter Saville – Design Consultant
 Howard Wakefield – Design
 Thomas Manss & Company – Design
 Martin Orpen and Idea – Digital Imaging

Charts

References

1994 greatest hits albums
New Order (band) compilation albums
Qwest Records compilation albums
London Records compilation albums
Albums produced by Stephen Hague
Albums produced by Arthur Baker (musician)
Albums produced by John Robie
Albums produced by Martin Hannett